Gross Reservoir, located in Boulder County, Colorado, is owned and operated by Denver Water. Completed in 1954, the reservoir has a surface area of 440 acres, and the spillway sits at 7,225 feet elevation.

The reservoir receives water from the western side of the Continental Divide through the Moffat Tunnel. South Boulder Creek flows out of the 340 foot-high dam.

Recreation
The reservoir provides opportunities for fishing (including ice fishing), hiking, canoeing, kayaking, and some camping. No water-contact sports such as swimming or wading are allowed. Only non-motorized boats are permitted — the type that can be attached to the top of a car.

Expansion project
The proposed expansion of Gross Reservoir would allow Denver Water to store 77,000 additional acre feet of water, drawn mostly from the Fraser and Williams Fork Rivers.

Denver Water applied to the U.S. Army Corps of Engineers for a permit under section 404 of the Clean Water Act, required to construct the expansion, and that permit was granted in 2017. In response, several environmental groups sued USACE on grounds that the agency's deliberations about granting the permit violated the Clean Water Act, Endangered Species Act, and National Environmental Policy Act. In July 2020 the Federal Energy Regulatory Commission granted a required modification to the Federal Power Act license granted to Colorado Water for Gross Dam before it was built.

A contract for design services was awarded to Stantec, an engineering consulting firm, in 2017. 

Boulder County announced in spring 2019 that it would require Denver Water to obtain a land use permit under Colorado law before commencing the expansion project. Denver Water submitted its application for that permit in September 2020.

Preparation work for the expansion is well underway. Overall the expansion is planned to raise the height of the dam by 131 feet which will triple the volume of the reservoir. With a goal of finishing the project in 2025. This will also make this the largest dam in the state of Colorado.

Climate

According to the Köppen Climate Classification system, Gross Reservoir has an oceanic climate, abbreviated "Cfb" on climate maps.

See also
List of largest reservoirs of Colorado
List of reservoirs in Colorado

References

External links
Expansion Project official website
Anti-Expansion Project official website

Reservoirs in Colorado
Protected areas of Boulder County, Colorado
Bodies of water of Boulder County, Colorado
1954 establishments in Colorado